The Château de Keriolet is a castle built in the 19th century in Concarneau (France).

History
At the end of 1850s, under the Second French Empire, Charles Chauveau met the Russian princess Zénaïde Narichkine-Ioussoupov. She was in love with him and bought him a count's title of Chauveau. The Château de Keriolet was commissioned by Zénaïde Narichkine-Ioussoupov (Felix Yusupov' defer grandmother), and built at the end of the 19th century by the French architect Joseph Bigot.

The count of Chauveau, 57-year-old, died in October, 1882 to Kériolet. Charles de Chauveau had bequeathed the domain to his sister, Madame Prieur. Zénaïde Narichkine-Ioussoupov bought back Kériolet and decided then to donate it, with her lands and her collections, to the department of Finistère.

In 1956, Felix Yusupov won a lawsuit and regained possession of the castle from the department of Finistère. The castle was sold to the city of Concarneau in 1971. In 1988, Christophe Lévèque, acquired the castle, restored it and reopened it to the public.

Description

Gallery

See also 
 Manoir de Stang-al-lin
 List of châteaux in Brittany

References

Bibliography

  Prince Félix Youssoupoff, La fin de Raspoutine, V&O Éditions, 1992
  A. Paban, Catalogue du Musée Départemental de Kériolet, Librairie Le Tendre, Concarneau, 1900
  Collectif, Le Guide Quimper, Éditions du patrimoine, 2006
  Gilles et Bleuzen du Pontavice, La cuisine des châteaux de Bretagne, Éditions Ouest-France, 1997
  Collecif, Bretagne XXe, un siècle d'architectures, Terre de Brume, Archives Modernes d'Architecture de Bretagne, 2001 
  Pierre Angrand, Histoire des musées de province au XIXe, l'Ouest, Le cercle d'or, 1984

Houses completed in 1883
Buildings and structures in Finistère
Concarneau
Monuments historiques of Finistère
Keriolet